Acanalonia bivittata, the two-striped planthopper, is a species of planthopper in the family Acanaloniidae, and the most common and widespread member of the genus Acanalonia. Adults of this species are typically green, though occasionally pink. There is a reddish stripe on the inner edge of the wing.

References

Auchenorrhyncha